Ove Andersen (22 August 1899 – 13 January 1967) was a Finnish long-distance runner, who won a bronze medal in the 3000 m steeplechase at the 1928 Summer Olympics.

References

1899 births
1967 deaths
People from Kotka
People from Viipuri Province (Grand Duchy of Finland)
Finnish male long-distance runners
Finnish male steeplechase runners
Olympic bronze medalists for Finland
Athletes (track and field) at the 1928 Summer Olympics
Olympic athletes of Finland
Medalists at the 1928 Summer Olympics
Olympic bronze medalists in athletics (track and field)
Sportspeople from Kymenlaakso